George Douglas McAvoy (June 21, 1931 – May 14, 1998) was a Canadian retired professional ice hockey defenceman who played 4 playoff games in the National Hockey League for the Montreal Canadiens during the 1954–55 season. The rest of his career, which lasted from 1951 to 1966, was spent in the minor leagues. McAvoy also played for the Canadian national team at the 1955 World Championships, winning a gold medal.

McAvoy was born in Edmonton, Alberta. He died on May 14, 1998.

Career statistics

Regular season and playoffs

International

References

External links
 

1931 births
1998 deaths
Boston Olympics players
Calgary Stampeders (ice hockey) players
Canadian ice hockey defencemen
Cleveland Barons (1937–1973) players
Montreal Canadiens players
New Westminster Royals (WHL) players
Providence Reds players
Ice hockey people from Edmonton